The Maynooth College Act 1795 (35 Geo. 3 c. 21) was an Act of the Parliament of Ireland that established and arranged the funding for St Patrick's College, Maynooth as Ireland's Catholic seminary.

Irish Catholic priests had traditionally been educated on the Continent in seminaries but in the aftermath of the French Revolution and during its ensuing wars many of these seminaries were either closed down or became inaccessible. Bishops were also worried that students on the Continent might become exposed to the "contagion of sedition and infidelity". The Dublin Castle administration had supported the passage of the Roman Catholic Relief Act 1793 but was opposed to full Catholic emancipation.

See also
 Maynooth College Act 1845

Notes

Acts of the Parliament of Ireland (pre-1801)
1795 in law
1795 in Ireland
St Patrick's College, Maynooth